Schrepfer or Schröpfer is a German language occupational surname for a barber-surgeon's assistant (Schröpfer literally means "cupping practitioner", Schröpfen "cupping") and may refer to:
Johann Georg Schrepfer (1738–1774), German charlatan, independent Freemason and necromancer
Nikole Schrepfer (1964), Swiss swimmer
Susan Schrepfer (1941–2014), American environmental historian

References 

German-language surnames
Occupational surnames